The 1980 Pan American Men's Handball Championship was the first edition of the Pan American Men's Handball Championship, held in Mexico from 7 to 14 January 1980. It acted as the American qualifying tournament for the 1980 Summer Olympics. The tournament was planned to be in 1979 but was delayed several times.

Standings

Results

According to Folha de S.Paulo 23–22.

Final ranking

Teams

Argentina
Players (Incomplete): Alejandro Quipiro, Alejandro Rodríguez, Horacio García, Juan Simonet

Brasilia
Coach: Antonio Carlos Simões
Players: William, Sergião, Chu, Montanha, Luizinho, Borracheiro, Mané, Roni, Foguete, Toco and Duilio Saba

Canada
Players (Incomplete): Dems Obzygaile, Pierre St. Martin, Hugues de Roussan

Mexico
Coach: David Quintos
Players (Incomplete): Mario García, Werner Damm, Carlos García, Herber Grote, Ricardo Bermejo, Carlos Meza, Cuauhtémoc Sánchez

References

External links
Results on todor66.com
 

1980 Men
American Men's Handball Championship
American Men's Handball Championship
International handball competitions hosted by Mexico
January 1980 sports events in North America
January 1980 events in Mexico